The Caucasian wisent (Bison bonasus caucasicus) or dombay (домбай) was a subspecies of European bison that inhabited the Caucasus Mountains of Eastern Europe.

Description

Little is known about morphological details of this subspecies including body size due to extinction before modern scientific approaches were made.

Comparared to the extant lowland wisent, the Caucasian bison was more adapted to mountainous habitat. Apparently, Caucasian bison was generally smaller (there had been arguments regarding the Caucasian bison to be smaller than the lowland bison, but most certainly less weighed), had shorter but higher hooves, had more developed shoulder girdles, had skulls similar in size to those found in Kuban region, had significantly thicker and larger horns, less shaggy coats, and curly hairs on head rear.

Natural enemies
It was hunted by the Caspian tiger and the Asiatic lion in the Caucasus, as well as other predators such as wolves and bears.

Decline and extinction

In the 17th century, the Caucasian bison still populated a large area of the Western Caucasus. After that human settlement in the mountains intensified and the range of the Caucasian wisent became reduced to about one tenth of its original range at the end of the 19th century. In the 1860s the population still numbered about 2,000, but was reduced to only 500-600 in 1917 and to only 50 in 1921. Local poaching continued; finally, in 1927, the last three Caucasian wisent were killed.

Hybrid survivors

Only one Caucasian bison bull is known to have been kept in captivity. This bull, named Kaukasus, was born in the Caucasus Mountains in 1907 and brought to Germany in 1908 where he lived until 26 February 1925. While in captivity, he bred with cows from the lowland subspecies Bison bonasus bonasus. Thus, he became one of the twelve ancestors of the present lowland-Caucasian breeding line of the European wisent pedigree book.

Wisent reintroductions in the Caucasus

In 1940, a group of wisent-American bison hybrids were released into the Caucasian
Biosphere Reserve and later in 1959 in the Nalchik Forestry Game Management Unit (Kabardino-Balkariya). Later some pure-blood wisent of the lowland-Caucasian breeding line were released there to form a single mixed herd together with the hybrids. 

In 2000, these hybrids were described as a different (without scientific basis) subspecies, the highland bison - Bison bonasus montanus (Polish).

See also
List of extinct animals of Europe
Carpathian wisent
Caucasian moose

References

External links
The Extinction Website - Caucasian European Bison - Bison bonasus caucasicus.
European bison / Wisent
History of the Caucasian European Bison (In Russian)

Bison
Mammal extinctions since 1500
Extinct mammals of Europe
Species made extinct by human activities